Les premières années (meaning The Early Years) is a French-language compilation album by Canadian singer Celine Dion, released in France by Versailles on 10 January 1994. It features eighteen rare songs recorded between 1982 and 1988, including the Eurovision-winning "Ne partez pas sans moi". In France, Les premières années was certified Gold. The album was also released in Belgium, reaching number twelve on the chart in Wallonia.

Background and content
After the success of "Un garçon pas comme les autres (Ziggy)", which reached number two on the French Singles Chart in 1993, Versailles issued Les premières années on 10 January 1994, a compilation of Dion's early and rare recordings from the '80s. In addition to the singles, it also includes album tracks and singles B-sides ("En amour", "Comment t'aimer").

Critical reception and commercial performance
AllMusic gave the album two and a half out of five stars. Thanks to the success of D'eux, Les premières années has eventually sold 180,000 copies in France and was certified Gold in November 1995. After being also released in Belgium, it entered the Wallonia Albums Chart in June 1995 and peaked at number twelve in November 1995.

Track listing

Personnel 
Adapted from AllMusic.

 Didier Barbelivien – composer
 Céline Dion – primary artist, vocals
 Thierry Geoffroy – composer
 Hubert Giraud – composer
 Jean-Pierre Goussaud – composer
 Andy Hill – composer
 J.P. Lang – composer
 Patrick Lemaitre – composer
 Christian Loigerot – composer
 Eddy Marnay – composer
 Nella Martinetti – composer
 Jean Claude Massoulier – composer
 Romano Musumarra – composer
 Francois Oren – composer
 André Popp – composer
 A. Sereftug – composer
 Peter Sinfield – composer
 R. Walt Vincent – composer

Charts

Weekly charts

Year-end charts

Certifications and sales

Release history

References

External links
 

1994 compilation albums
Albums produced by Eddy Marnay
Celine Dion compilation albums